Phoenix Building may refer to:

Australia 
 Phoenix Buildings, Woolloongabba, heritage-listed commercial buildings in Brisbane, Queensland, Australia

United States 
 Phoenix Building/Cincinnati Club, two heritage-listed buildings in downtown Cincinnati, Ohio
Phoenix Building in Milwaukee, Wisconsin's Historic Third Ward
 Phoenix Building (Pittsford, New York),  heritage-listed inn and tavern in Monroe County, New York
 Phoenix Building (Rockland, Massachusetts), heritage-listed building in Rockland, Massachusetts
 Manhattan Building (Muskogee, Oklahoma), also known as the Phoenix Building or the Phoenix-Manhattan Building, a heritage-listed skyscraper in Muskogee, Oklahoma
 Phoenix Life Insurance Company Building in Hartford, Connecticut